Oracle School District 2 is a school district in Pinal County, Arizona.
Oracle School District 2 Operates one school. Mountain Vista School

References

External links
 

School districts in Pinal County, Arizona